Emperor Zhang can refer to:

 Emperor Zhang of Han (漢章帝, 56-88), emperor of the Han Dynasty
 Emperor Zhang of Ming (章皇帝, 1399-1435), posthumous name of Xuande Emperor
 Emperor Zhang of Qing (章皇帝, 1638-1661), posthumous name of Shunzhi Emperor